Mount Zeigler is a mountain (1,120 m) 3 miles (4.8 km) north-northeast of Mount Swartley in the Allegheny Mountains, Marie Byrd Land. Mapped by United States Antarctic Service (USAS) (1939–41) and by United States Geological Survey (USGS) from surveys and U.S. Navy air photos (1959–65). Named by Advisory Committee on Antarctic Names (US-ACAN) for Lieutenant Commander Luther L. Zeigler, U.S. Navy, pilot on LC-130F Hercules aircraft flights during Operation Deep Freeze 1968.

Mountains of Marie Byrd Land